Cretoperomyia is a genus of wood midges in the family Cecidomyiidae. The one described species - Cretoperomyia dmitrii - is only known from Taymyr amber from the Late Cretaceous.

References

Cecidomyiidae genera

Insects described in 2016
Taxa named by Zoya A. Fedotova
Taxa named by Evgeny Perkovsky
Fossil taxa described in 2016
Monotypic Diptera genera
Prehistoric Diptera genera